Willagee Bears Rugby League Club is an Australian rugby league football club based in Willagee, Western Australia formed in the early 1960s. They conduct teams for both junior and senior teams.

Notable Juniors
Shanice Parker (2015- Australian Jillaroos)
Chance Peni (2013-14 Newcastle Knights U20)
Royce Hunt (2017 Canberra Raiders & Sharks)
Jordan Pererira (2018- St George Illawarra Dragons)

See also

Rugby league in Western Australia

References

External links
 

Rugby league teams in Western Australia
Sporting clubs in Perth, Western Australia
1962 establishments in Australia
Rugby clubs established in 1962